Africa: A Voyage of Discovery was a series about the history of Africa with Basil Davidson. It was produced in a collaboration between Channel 4, the Nigerian Television Authority and RM Arts in 1984 and consisted of eight parts in four episodes.  The film received the Gold Award from the 1984 International Film and Television Festival of New York. Each part is around an hour long.

 Different But Equal 
 Mastering of a Continent 
 Caravans of Gold 
 The King and The City 
 The Bible and the Gun 
 The Magnificent African Cake 
 The Rise of Nationalism 
 The Legacy

References

External links
 

1984 British television series debuts
1984 British television series endings
1980s British documentary television series
Channel 4 documentary series
Documentary films about Africa
Documentary films about African resistance to colonialism
Films shot in Algeria
Films shot in Egypt
Films shot in Ethiopia
Films shot in Ghana
Films shot in Kenya
Films shot in Mali
Films shot in Mozambique
Films shot in Nigeria
Films shot in Senegal
Films shot in Sudan
Films shot in Tanzania
Films shot in Zimbabwe